Oleg Yaroslavovich Antonov (born 28 July 1988) is a Russian-born Italian volleyball player, a member of the Italy men's national volleyball team and Italian club Trentino Volley, silver medalist of the 2015 World Cup, bronze medalist of the 2015 European Championship. He is the son of Yaroslav Antonov, a former Russian volleyball player, a 1988 Summer Olympics silver medalist for the Soviet Union.

Sporting achievements

Clubs

FIVB Club World Championship
  2016 - with Trentino Diatec

CEV Champions League
  2015/2016 - with Trentino Diatec

National championships
 2016/2017  Italian Championship, with Diatec Trentino

National team
 2015  FIVB World Cup
 2016  Olympic Games

External links
FIVB profile 
LegaVolley player profile

1988 births
Living people
Sportspeople from Moscow
Trentino Volley players
Italian men's volleyball players
Olympic volleyball players of Italy
Volleyball players at the 2016 Summer Olympics
Medalists at the 2016 Summer Olympics
Olympic silver medalists for Italy
Olympic medalists in volleyball
Expatriate volleyball players in France
Naturalised citizens of Italy
Russian emigrants to Italy
Galatasaray S.K. (men's volleyball) players
Outside hitters
Tours Volley-Ball players